The mtDNA control region is an area of the mitochondrial genome which is non-coding DNA. This region controls RNA and DNA synthesis. It is the most polymorphic region of the human mtDNA genome, with polymorphism concentrated in hypervariable regions. The average nucleotide diversity in these regions is 1.7%. Despite this variability, an RNA transcript from this region has a conserved secondary structure (pictured) which has been found to be under selective pressure.

The mtDNA control region contains the origin of replication of one strand, and the origin of transcription for both strands. There is also an open reading frame thought to code for 7s ribosomal RNA in humans but not in mice or cows, where it has been deleted.

Distinction from D-loop
The control region and mtDNA D-loop are sometimes used synonymously in the literature; specifically the control region includes the D-loop along with adjacent transcription promoter regions. For this reason, the control region is also known by the acronym DLP, standing for D-Loop and associated Promoters.

Endurance study
mtDNA control region haplotypes have been linked with endurance capacity in human subjects. A 2002 study sequenced the control region of 55 subjects and compared their haplotype with the increase in VO2 max after an eight-week training program. They found that different haplotypes were significantly linked with the subjects' endurance. It was speculated that this was because the control region affects replication and transcription in the mitochondria.

See also
D-loop
Hypervariable region

References

Further reading

External links
EMPOP - the Mitochondrial DNA Control Region Database
 

DNA
Mitochondrial genetics